Avenida Pueyrredón is an avenue that runs through Recoleta and Balvanera neighborhoods of Buenos Aires, Argentina, and goes from southwest to northeast, parallel Avenida 9 de Julio. It starts at Avenida Rivadavia, and ends at Avenida Figueroa Alcorta.

The Avenue stars at Avenida Rivadavia intersection front of Plaza Miserere and Once Railway Station.

The Buenos Aires Underground has numerous stations that serve Avenida Pueyrredón; stations Plaza Miserere on Line , Pueyrredón on Line , Pueyrredón on Line  and Once, Corrientes, Córdoba, Santa Fe and Las Heras on Line .

Gallery

Pueyrredon